Serbia has participated in the Eurovision Song Contest 14 times since making its debut in . Serbia won the contest on its debut as an independent country in 2007, with "Molitva" by Marija Šerifović. Serbia's other top ten results are sixth place and tenth place.

History

As Serbia was part of Yugoslavia, it had the opportunity to participate in the Eurovision Song Contest after Yugoslavia's debut at the contest in 1961. It debuted the same year as Spain and Finland and became the first and, for three decades, only socialist country to participate in the competition. The best result of Yugoslavia occurred in 1989 when it won with "Rock Me", sung in Serbo-Croatian and English by Riva. Yugoslavia participated regularly until its breakup between 1991 and 1992.

After a period of absence from 1993 until 2003, Serbia and Montenegro returned to the contest in 2004. They finished in second place with song "Lane moje" performed by Željko Joksimović. By 2006, Serbia and Montenegro split, and with Serbia making its debut entry as an independent nation with the ballad "Molitva" by Marija Šerifović.

The second Serbian entry, performed in Belgrade was written by past entrant for Serbia as part of Serbia and Montenegro and contest host Željko Joksimović. The song "Oro", an ethnic ballad, performed by Jelena Tomašević came 6th and received 160 points in the overall rankings.

In 2009, Serbia selected Marko Kon and Milaan to represent them in the second semi-final on 14 May. The duo failed to qualify for the final, marking it the first time Serbia failed to qualify for the final since the introduction of semi-finals.

In 2010, Milan Stanković was selected to represent the country in the contest with "Ovo je Balkan", an upbeat song with ethno elements, and is about a love story set in Belgrade. It qualified for the final and in the end achieved 13th place with 72 points.

In 2011, Nina was selected with her 1960s inspired song, "Čaroban". She was accompanied with three other singers who would be dancing throughout the performance. In the semi-finals She performed 6th and qualified for the final. In the final, she performed 24th and achieved 14th place.

After finishing second in 2004 when representing Serbia and Montenegro, Željko Joksimović returned to compete in 2012 with the song "Nije ljubav stvar". On the second semi-final he took second place, while he finished third in the final, below second-placed Russia and the winner, Sweden.

Moje 3 represented Serbia in the Eurovision Song Contest 2013 in Malmö with the song "Ljubav je svuda". They would finish 11th in the first semi-final, therefore not qualifying for the final. This was the second time that Serbia did not qualify for the final.

On 22 November 2013, Serbian broadcaster Radio Television of Serbia (RTS) announced that it would withdraw from the 2014 contest due to financial difficulties and a lack of available sponsorship for a potential Serbian entry.

In April 2014, Serbia announced that they will broadcast all three shows. In addition, they said that it is likely to return at 2015 and that they will probably hold a national selection to find their representative. On 26 September 2014, it was reported that Serbia had decided to return to the  contest to be held in Austrian capital, Vienna.

On 15 February 2015 Serbia chose their own representative in the TV show "Odbrojavanje za Beč". Odbrojavanje za Beč (English: Countdown for Vienna) was the national final organised by RTS in order to select the Serbian entry for the Eurovision Song Contest 2015. The selection featured three songs composed by Vladimir Graić, the composer of Serbia's winning entry "Molitva" in 2007. Two of the songs were performed by established Serbian artists Bojana Stamenov and Aleksa Jelić, while one was performed by Danica Krstić, a new talent chosen by Graić through a scouting process.

Bojana Stamenov was selected as the Serbian representative for Vienna through a 50:50 voting system, where both the audience and the jury voted for her song "Ceo svet je moj" (The whole world is mine) to represent Serbia in Austria. It was later announced that she would perform her song in English (a first for a Serbian entry) titled "Beauty Never Lies". Despite being low with the odds and fan votings, Bojana surprised everyone in the first semifinal and became one of the big press and fan favourites. She qualified to the final with 9th place in Semi-Final 1, but managed to achieve another top 10 result for Serbia in the Grand Final, scoring 53 points and the 10th place.

In 2016 RTS selected Sanja Vučić and her song "Goodbye (Shelter)" internally as well. She qualified for the final placing 10th out of 18 and came 18th of 26 in the final with 115 points.

Tijana Bogićević was selected as the Serbian representative for Kyiv. with the song "In Too Deep". She would finish 11th in the second semi-final, therefore not qualifying for the final. This was the third time that Serbia did not qualify for the final.

In 2018 RTS went back to a national final, Beovizija (which had been used to select their first entrants). Sanja Ilić and Balkanika won with the song "Nova deca" They qualified for the final for the first time in a year, placing 9th out of 18 in their semi-final; they then came 19th of 26 in the final, receiving 113 points. Following their success in making the final, RTS confirmed that Beovizija would be maintained as their selection method in 2019. Nevena Božović won Beovizija 2019 with her song "Kruna". Placing 7th with 156 points in the first semi-final, she qualified for the final, where she then performed 23rd and came 18th out of 26 acts, with 89 points in total.

Beovizija was used again for 2020, with girl group Hurricane winning the selection with "Hasta la vista". However, the 2020 contest was cancelled due to the COVID-19 pandemic, and RTS internally selected Hurricane to represent the country again in 2021 with "Loco Loco", which went on to finish in 15th place in the final with 102 points.

For 2022, RTS changed the name of the national selection from Beovizija to Pesma za Evroviziju ("A song for Eurovision"). The winner of Pesma za Evroviziju '22 was Konstrakta with "In corpore sano". At Eurovision in Turin, she successfully qualified to the final, where she managed to get fifth place, the best result for Serbia since 2012.

Participation overview 

Hostings

Awards

Marcel Bezençon Awards

Winner by OGAE members

Barbara Dex Award

Related involvement

Heads of delegations

Commentators and spokespersons
All the events were broadcast on RTS1, except the  final and the  second semi-final, which were broadcast on RTS2.

Kosovan entrants

After Kosovo's declaration of independence from Serbia in 2008, its broadcaster RTK was applying for EBU membership, and wished to enter Kosovo independently into Eurovision Song Contest 2009. Kosovo is partially recognised and not a member of the United Nations, and UN membership is required to obtain full EBU membership. As of 2013, RTK has observer status within the EBU and did participate in the Eurovision Young Dancers once. Before the declaration of independence, several Kosovo Albanian artists competed in the Festivali i Këngës, the national selection for Albania. Rona Nishliu, a Kosovan singer, placed 5th in the grand final in 2012 for Albania and Lindita represented Albania in 2017.

Serbia claims Kosovo as its own Autonomous Province of Kosovo and Metohija. Some singers from Kosovo, especially Kosovo Serbs, participate in the Serbian national selection for the Eurovision Song Contest, organized by RTS. Kosovo-born Nevena Božović represented Serbia in the Junior Eurovision Song Contest and twice in the Eurovision Song Contest, first as a member of Moje 3 in 2013 and later as a solo act in 2019.

Photogallery

See also
Serbia in the Junior Eurovision Song Contest
Serbia and Montenegro in the Eurovision Song Contest
Serbia and Montenegro in the Junior Eurovision Song Contest
Yugoslavia in the Eurovision Song Contest
Kosovo in the Eurovision Song Contest
Kosovo in the Eurovision Young Dancers

Notes

References

External links
 Points to and from Serbia eurovisioncovers.co.uk

 
Countries in the Eurovision Song Contest